Park Jong-ah (born 13 June 1996) is a South Korean ice hockey player and the captain of the South Korean national ice hockey team,  playing in the Korean Women's Hockey League (KWHL) with the Suwon City Hall women's ice hockey team. , she was the all-time leader in goals (41) and points scored (66) for the South Korean women's national team.

Playing career
Alongside North Korean ice hockey player Jong Su-hyon, Park was the penultimate torchbearer at the 2018 Winter Olympics opening ceremony.

Park participated in the women's ice hockey tournament at the 2018 Winter Olympics as part of a unified team of 35 players drawn from both the North Korean and South Korean national teams.

Following her Olympic appearance, Park competed with the South Korean team at the 2018 IIHF Women's World Championship Division I Group B tournament, where she led the team in total points (4 goals, 3 assists), was selected as the Best Forward or the Tournament, and selected by coaches as the Best Player of the South Korean team.

Career statistics

International
Italics indicate tournament not included in official totals.

Sources:

Awards and honors
Directorate Award, Best Forward: 2018 IIHF Women's World Championship Division I, Group B
Best Player on Team Selected by Coaches: 2018 IIHF Women's World Championship Division I, Group B
Best Player on Team Selected by Coaches: 2022 IIHF Women's World Championship Division I, Group B

References

External links
 
 

1996 births
Living people
Ice hockey players at the 2017 Asian Winter Games
Ice hockey players at the 2018 Winter Olympics
Olympic ice hockey players of South Korea
People from Gangneung
South Korean women's ice hockey forwards
University of Saskatchewan alumni
Winter Olympics competitors for Korea
Sportspeople from Gangwon Province, South Korea